The bug-eyed monster (BEM) is an early convention of the science fiction genre. Extraterrestrials in science fiction of the 1930s were often described (or pictured on covers of pulp magazines) as grotesque creatures with huge, oversized
or compound eyes and a lust for women, blood or general destruction. 

In the contactee/abductee mythology, which grew up quickly beginning in 1952, the blond, blue-eyed, and friendly Nordic aliens of the 1950s were quickly replaced by small, unfriendly bug-eyed creatures, closely matching in many respects the pulp cover clichés of the 1930s which have remained the abductor norm since the 1960s.

Popular culture
 The Daleks from Doctor Who. When the show was created, the BBC producers stated that Doctor Who would be a "hard" science fiction show, and there would be no bug-eyed monsters – explicitly stated by show creator Sydney Newman. Writer Terry Nation created the Daleks in the show's second serial, much to Newman's disapproval.
 The main character in the animated children's television series Invader Zim is a bug-eyed monster.
 The Pokémon species "Beheeyem" is based on the concept of bug-eyed monsters in its design, characteristics, and name.
 Arthur Dent in The Hitchhikers Guide to the Galaxy sarcastically asks if he and Ford Prefect were picked up by a green bug-eyed monster, which Ford confirms the Vogons to be.
 In "What Is This Thing Called Love?", Isaac Asimov's parody of both pulp fiction and the bug-eyed monster idea, a woman captured by aliens for the purposes of study keeps using the term when referring to her captor.

See also 
Insectoid

References

Stock characters
Extraterrestrial life in popular culture